DeVon "Devo" Harris (born December 9, 1977), also known as Devo Springsteen, is an American producer and songwriter. Harris launched the career of EGOT winner John Legend by signing him to Kanye West’s GOOD Music in 2003. Harris produced and co-wrote many songs from Legend's first albums, as well as songs for Nas, Britney Spears, Aretha Franklin, Ol' Dirty Bastard, The Last Poets, and more in addition to DJing around the world. Devo won the Grammy Award for Best Rap Song in 2006 for his production of "Diamonds from Sierra Leone" by Kanye West. After earning his MBA from Columbia Business School in 2011, Devo turned to technology where he became a media entrepreneur and inventor.

Biography

Harris grew up in the U.S. and Germany. Both of his parents were in the U.S. Army. He graduated high school from The Pembroke Hill School in Kansas City, Missouri, and then attended the Wharton School of the University of Pennsylvania. At Penn, he wrestled, played football, and DJed at local radio stations WPPR and WQHS FM. After graduating with degrees in Economics and Strategic Management, he moved to New York City in 2000 with college roommate John Legend. While working in venture capital, he began working part-time assisting and serving as A&R at the production company G.O.O.D. Music (then called Konman Productions). Devo eventually signed Legend to the label in 2003 and managed his project. Devo then earned an MBA degree from Columbia Business School.

Music
Devo's influences include Stevie Wonder, The Doors, Michael Jackson, Rick Rubin, Timbaland, and Dr. Dre. Harris has appeared on MTV Base, BET Style, and VH1 and was a featured guest DJ on BET's Rap City.

Harris also co-wrote the tracks "Lullaby" and "Let's Go" with Britney Spears and Tom Craskey. The song appeared on the demo version of Britney's album Blackout.

In 2008, Harris collaborated with John Legend on "If You're Out There" which appears in John Legend's third studio album Evolver. The song was used Barack Obama's campaign theme song and was performed at the 2008 Democratic National Convention.

Technology
In 2010, Harris created an interactive music video, "Attack of the 5 foot Hipster", by U.S. band Riot In Paris, which debuted on UniverseCity blog and was noted as the first interactive choose-your-own-adventure music video in the U.S. After graduating from Columbia Business School in 2011, Harris started his career in technology by teaching himself to code and launched Red Ochre Inc. in 2014. Soon after, he would become a Senior Product Manager at Vimeo. 

In 2020, Harris launched Adventr, an interactive streaming platform. In September 2021, Adventr became a finalist in the 2021 TechCrunch Disrupt Conference and announced its patent on voice-controlled interactive media.

Discography

Singles

Mixtapes
2006, "Bacardi Big Apple & Devo Springsteen Present: The Good Life"

Grammy Award history

References

External links
AllHipHop Feature - Devo Springsteen: Whip It!
BigMusicBiz.com Interview - Devo Springsteen

Kanye West
African-American musicians
1977 births
Musicians from Philadelphia
Record producers from Pennsylvania
American DJs
Wharton School of the University of Pennsylvania alumni
Living people
Grammy Award winners
21st-century African-American people
20th-century African-American people
Columbia Business School alumni